Tetraberlinia is a genus of plants in the family Fabaceae.

Species accepted by the Plants of the World Online as of February 2021:

Tetraberlinia baregarum 
Tetraberlinia bifoliolata 
Tetraberlinia korupensis 
Tetraberlinia longiracemosa 
Tetraberlinia moreliana 
Tetraberlinia polyphylla 
Tetraberlinia tubmaniana

References

Detarioideae
Fabaceae genera
Taxonomy articles created by Polbot